The Big Bow Mystery is an 1892 mystery novel by the British writer Israel Zangwill. It was originally serialised in The Star newspaper in 1891, before being published as a novel the following year. Set in London's East End, it is one of the earliest examples of the locked-room mystery genre.

Film adaptations
The story served as the basis for three Hollywood film versions. The Perfect Crime (1928) and The Crime Doctor (1934) were both set in the contemporary United States, while The Verdict (1946) returned the story to the late-Victorian London setting of the original novel.

Bibliography
 Goble, Alan. The Complete Index to Literary Sources in Film. Walter de Gruyter, 1999.
 Herbert, Rosemary. Whodunit?: A Who's Who in Crime & Mystery Writing. Oxford University Press, 2003.

References

External links

 The Big Bow Mystery at the Internet Archive.

1892 British novels
British mystery novels
Novels set in London
British novels adapted into films